The Denver Kid is a 1948 American Western film directed by Philip Ford and written by Robert Creighton Williams. The film stars Allan Lane, Eddy Waller, William "Bill" Henry, Douglas Fowley, Rory Mallinson and George Lloyd. The film was released on October 1, 1948, by Republic Pictures.

Plot
Border Patrol agent Lt. Fletch Roberts (Bruce Edwards) is lured into an ambush and murdered, the killers stealing a herd of horses and fleeing across the state line, where the Border Patrol agents can't follow. After Roberts' brother Tim (William Henry) is implicated in the murder, his best friend Lt. Rocky Lane (Allan Lane) goes undercover across the state line to find out the truth about the murder. Rocky poses as an outlaw to infiltrate the gang and find out more information. With help from Tim, local pharmacist Nugget (Eddy Waller), and his horse Black Jack, Rocky is able to track down the real killer and save the herd of stolen horses.

Cast    
Allan Lane as Rocky Lane Posing as the Denver Kid 
Black Jack as Black Jack
Eddy Waller as Nugget
William "Bill" Henry as Tim Roberts aka Tom Richards 
Douglas Fowley as Henchman Slip
Rory Mallinson as Jason Fox
George Lloyd as Sheriff Howie
George Meeker as Dealer Andre
Emmett Vogan as Captain Stan Roberts
Hank Patterson as Sergeant Cooper
Bruce Edwards as Fletch Roberts
Peggy Wynne as Saloon Girl Mitzie
Tom Steele as Jeff
Carole Gallagher as Barbara

References

External links 
 

1948 films
American Western (genre) films
1948 Western (genre) films
Republic Pictures films
Films directed by Philip Ford
American black-and-white films
1940s English-language films
1940s American films